Cozia Monastery, erected close to Călimănești by Mircea the Elder in 1388 and housing his tomb, is one of the most valuable monuments of national medieval art and architecture in Romania.

History
The name of the monastery is of Cuman origin and it means "walnut grove", from Turkic word koz, meaning walnut. The original name of the place was the Romanian equivalent, Nucetul, but already in 1387, a document of Mircea cel Bătrân uses the current name.

The fortified cloister dates from the foundation (1388) and is the only in Byzantine style preserved in Romania. Two chapels are incorporated in the side toward the Olt River and their Byzantine cupolas are reflected in the water, creating one of the most iconic cultural - natural landmarks in Romania.

The church façades' decorations with stone rosettes, horizontal Byzantine-style rows of brick and stone and vertical frames are unprecedented in Wallachian architecture and are typical from the Serbian Morava School, which flourished in central Serbia between the 14th century and the 15th century. In fact, the strong resemblance with the Lazarica church indicates that  Mircea cel Bătrân employed Serbian craftsmen. 

The appearance of the church was modified under Neagoe Basarab (1517), Şerban Cantacuzino and Constantin Brâncoveanu (1707), who added a veranda, a new fountain, a chapel and a watch tower, adding to its architecture the 'brâncovenesc style'.

Of great value is the hospital church, 'bolnița' (1543), with original well-preserved indoor frescoes like the votive portrait of ruler Mircea cel Bătrân and his sons.

Cozia was painted between 1390 and 1391. Some of the original frescoes (1390) are still well preserved.

The church of the monastery was put on a Romanian stamp in 1968.

Museum

Cozia features a museum of exhibiting old art: old manuscripts and prints, embroideries and objects of worship.

Burials
 Mircea I of Wallachia
 Carol Hohenzollern

References

External links

 The Cozia Monastery, official site, but currently (3 sept 2015) hacked by some malware system.
  Mănăstirea Cozia, at Episcopia Râmnicului
 Virtual Tour of Cozia Monastery

Romanian Orthodox monasteries of Vâlcea County
Historic monuments in Vâlcea County
Museums in Vâlcea County
Religious museums in Romania
1388 establishments in Europe
Christian monasteries established in the 14th century
Place names of Turkish origin in Romania
Burial sites of the House of Basarab
14th-century establishments in Romania